John Corbett (bapt. 29 June 1817 – 22 April 1901) was an English industrialist,  philanthropist and Liberal Party politician of the  Victorian era.  He is particularly associated with the salt industry in Stoke Prior and Droitwich Spa, Worcestershire. Locally he was nicknamed The Salt King.

Family background 
Corbett was born in Brierley Hill, Staffordshire, where his father, Joseph Corbett, ran a successful canal transport business. John joined the family business but by 1850 canals were facing increasing competition from the new and expanding railways.

Foresight 

John Corbett sold his share of the family canal business and, in 1853, purchased disused salt workings in Stoke Prior from the British Alkali Company. Corbett brought all the innovations of the industrial revolution to mechanise and commercialise the business, soon making his salt workings the largest in Europe and built a great fortune.

Philanthropy 

However he did not simply utilise this fortune just for his own ends, preferring to reinvest profits into the business processes, innovation and also into improving his workforce's working conditions and even raising wages. His workers were so well paid, for the time, that many could boast that their wives did not need to work at all.

He purchased a  rundown house near to his birthplace, The Hill in Amblecote  in December 1891. He repaired and refurbished the house, changing its use into a hospital and endowed it to the local people on 31 July 1893 as Corbett Hospital, with a sum of £2,000 for endowment (increased by public subscription to £5,000) and two sums of £500 towards the repairs fund and furnishing. John Corbett never lived at The Hill.

Politics 

He was elected at the 1874 general election as Member of Parliament (MP) for the Droitwich, having unsuccessfully contested the seat in 1868. He was re-elected at three subsequent general elections, joining the breakaway Liberal Unionists when the Liberal Party split in 1886 over Home Rule for Ireland. Corbett retired from the House of Commons at the 1892 general election.

Marriage 

In 1855 he met his future wife Hanna O'Meara in Paris. She lived in Paris with her Irish father and mother. He married her within a year of meeting her. They had six children together.

She missed her elegant Parisian lifestyle and the French upbringing she had enjoyed so Corbett had a French style chateau built to assuage her homesickness, completed in 1875 for the staggering cost, at the time, of £247,000. Chateau Impney still stands today, as a well-known landmark just outside Droitwich Spa.

They separated after nearly thirty years of marriage.

Retirement 

In 1888, he sold the massive salt business to the Salt Union Ltd for GBP £660,000 (equivalent to £50 million in 2007). He spent much of the proceeds in philanthropic work in and around Droitwich Spa, buying St. Andrew's House and turning it into the Raven Hotel. At the end of the 19th century, he presented a veranda to the Aberdovey literary institute.

He died on 22 April 1901 and was buried in the churchyard of St Michaels, Stoke Prior, Worcestershire.

Notes

External links 

Local history page with some photographs
This is Worcestershire
The Corbett Study Group
John Corbett's contributions in Parliament

1817 births
1901 deaths
Liberal Party (UK) MPs for English constituencies
Liberal Unionist Party MPs for English constituencies
UK MPs 1874–1880
UK MPs 1880–1885
UK MPs 1885–1886
UK MPs 1886–1892
English philanthropists
People from Brierley Hill
Members of the Parliament of the United Kingdom for Droitwich
19th-century English businesspeople